Doryphora is a genus of plant in the family Atherospermataceae, or formerly Monimiaceae. It contains four species, two endemic to Australia and two to New Caledonia.

Overview
They are evergreen trees or shrubs from southern hemisphere of gondwanan origin, native to the temperate rainforests. The trees will reach approximately 100 feet (30 m) tall. They have dark to medium green lanceolate lauroid leaves with serrated edges. The leaves have a strong sarsaparilla odor when crushed. The lumber is used in cabinetry and a tonic is made from the bark of some species, Doryphora aromatica and Doryphora sassafras, which also have insect-repelling properties.

The flowers are white star-shaped. The blooms cover the tree at canopy level in the rainforest.

They are cloud forest plants and need partial shade to full sun with a moist well-drained soil mix. The plants must kept moist at all times. The winter temperature must not fall below 50 °F (10 °C).

Doryphora are propagated by birds that eat the berries. The seed are very small and germinate in 80–100 days at 70 °F (21 °C).

This genus originated in the Antarctic flora, and shares plant species with South America, New Caledonia, Tasmania and Australia, in habitats of cloud forest and temperate rainforest. It was in the Cretaceous that angiosperm flora colonized New Zealand and New Caledonia, from South America, along the Antarctic margin of Gondwana, with species as Nothofagus and Proteaceae. They are yet umbrófila plants in forest or rainforest in place like New Caledonia.

The genus includes plants with vicariant species that fulfil the same ecological role in other areas. The role of Nothofagus and Podocarpaceae was occupied by the Taxus and various oaks in other places.

Species
Doryphora aromatica (Bailey) L.S.Sm. (northeast Queensland)
Doryphora sassafras Endl. (east Queensland and New South Wales)
Doryphora austro-caledonica Seem. 
Doryphora vieillardi Baill. (New Caledonia)

Atherospermataceae
Laurales genera
Laurales of Australia